DnaJ homolog subfamily C member 1 is a protein that in humans is encoded by the DNAJC1 gene.

Interactions 

DNAJC1 has been shown to interact with Alpha 1-antichymotrypsin.

References

Further reading

External links 
 PDBe-KB provides an overview of all the structure information available in the PDB for Human DnaJ homolog subfamily C member 1

Heat shock proteins